Alessandro Zanni (born 31 January 1984 in Udine) is a former Italian rugby union player who has played over 100 times for . His usual position was a number 8, but in national team and Benetton he has played openside flanker, blindside flanker and Lock.

Zanni made his debut for the Italian national team in November 2005 in a Test against  and has been a regular in the Italian test team ever since winning his 100th cap against  on 4 February 2018.

About Rugby World Cup, on 21 August 2011, he was named in the final 31-man squad for the 2015 Rugby World Cup., on 24 August 2015, he was named in the final 31-man squad for the 2015 Rugby World Cup and on 18 August 2019, he was named in the final 31-man squad for the 2019 Rugby World Cup.
He also parteciped to 2007 Rugby World Cup.

References

External links
It's Rugby France Profile

1984 births
Living people
Sportspeople from Udine
Italian rugby union players
Rugby union number eights
Italy international rugby union players
Benetton Rugby players